The Pakistan String Puppetry festival is Pakistan's biggest city-wide String Puppetry Festival with more than 300 performances for 30,000 viewers held from October to January in Karachi, Pakistan. It is organized by Thespianz Theatre. The festival began in October 2016. The festival endeavors to charm audiences, raise awareness and urges the rejection of extremism and violence.

First Festival 
The first festival began on 25 October 2016 with the aim to heal the Karachi city through 300 various string puppetry performances in 79 schools, colleges, and universities. Three plays Jheel Saiful Malook, Sindbad and one promoting harmony between the four provinces were presented.

Performances were attended by private company owners, famous and the media.

Second Festival 
The second Pakistan String Puppetry Festival by Thespianz Theatre began on January 14 and till July 31, 2019. With 330 puppet shows, the event considered to be the longest festival held in Pakistan, to date. The festival held at 11 areas in Karachi for the reason to provide entertainment to the lower socio-economic class for free and inculcate awareness about acceptance, religious harmony and Pakistan's cultural values.

The festival held at the outskirts of Karachi and mainly slum areas.

Faisal Malik (artistic director of Thespianz Theatre) leads this festival while Nouman Mehmood has written the scrips for festival performances with an easy-to-understand wordings so that a common man understand the social messages. 100 unique puppets were presented in this festival to highlight different culture of Pakistan through traditional attires of Sindhis, Punjabis, Baluchis, Pashtuns and other traditions.

The festival has been endorsed by a number of national and International news agencies such as BBC Urdu, Voice of Australia, Pakistan-Asia News and Voice of America.

References 

Festivals in Karachi
Festivals in Pakistan
Karachi-related lists
Puppet festivals